The Hong Kong national badminton team is a badminton team that plays for Hong Kong SAR, China in international competitions. The Hong Kong national team won bronze at the 2019 Badminton Asia Mixed Team Championships, also known as the Tong Yun Kai Cup.

The women's team were semifinalists at the 2002 Uber Cup. The women's team also won bronze in the 2018 Asian Games women's team event.

Competitive record

**Red border color indicates tournament was held on home soil.

Player

Current squad
The following players was selected to represent Hong Kong at the 2023 Badminton Asia Mixed Team Championships.

Male players
Chow Hin Long
Lee Cheuk Yiu
Law Cheuk Him
Lee Chun Hei
Lui Chun Wai
Ng Ka Long
Tang Chun Man
Yeung Shing Choi

Female players
Fan Ka Yan
Liang Ka Wing
Lui Lok Lok
Ng Tsz Yau
Ng Wing Yung
Saloni Samirbhai Mehta
Tse Ying Suet
Yau Mau Ying

References

Badminton
National badminton teams
Badminton in Hong Kong